The Endless Quest books were three series of gamebooks. The first one was released in the 1980s by TSR, while the following two were released by Wizards of the Coast. Originally, these books were the result of an Educational department established by TSR with the intention of developing curriculum programs for subjects such as reading, math, history, and problem solving.

The first series of 36 books was released from 1982 to 1987, the second series of 13 from 1994 to 1996. 
These were respectively the first and last gamebooks released by TSR. A short  spin-off series of 4 Endless Quest: Crimson Crystal Adventures books were also released during 1985. There were also several series of similar books that did not bear the Endless Quest name.

The mechanics of these books involved simple choices in the style of Choose Your Own Adventure books, rather than the game-like randomized elements of Fighting Fantasy gamebooks. However, the stories and characters in an Endless Quest book, while not necessarily more complex than in a Choose Your Own Adventure book, are often more fully developed because the Endless Quest books are much longer. For example, the character referred to as "you" in the text almost always has a name, gender, and backstory. The result is that the books in the Endless Quest series resemble miniature novels with many different endings. 

The majority of the books in the series were based on Dungeons & Dragons, but some were based on other TSR games (e.g. Gamma World, Top Secret) or even licensed properties (e.g. Conan, Tarzan).

Mirrorstone, a division of Wizards of the Coast that publishes fantasy fiction for children and teens, began republishing the Endless Quest series in January 2008. The first book in the series is a revision of Claw of the Dragon (#34 from Series One). They have updated the book, including making it gender neutral so it can be enjoyed by both boys and girls, and plan to update and publish more of the D&D books pending the success of this first title.



Endless Quest: Series One

Collectors' sets 
 contains Books 1–4, 
 contains Books 5–8, 
 contains Books 9–12, 
 contains Books 13–16,

Endless Quest: Crimson Crystal Adventures
TSR also released a spin-off series of four Endless Quest: Crimson Crystal Adventures books during 1985.  These books add a small twist in the form of a clear sheet of red plastic that comes stapled to the inside.  This plastic piece is removed and then overlaid on top of certain portions of the book to reveal hidden images (by acting as an optical filter).

Endless Quest: Series Two
The second series differed from the first in several ways: they were printed in smaller type, the section numbers were independent of the page numbers, they were based on different original games, and they were not officially numbered (collectors and gamers use the numbering shown below, continuing from series one, for convenience).

* These were never released. The Test was written, turned in, and ready to print, but dropped at the last minute. Sands of Deception was written, but dropped as well.

Endless Quest (2018-9)
These books were all written by Matt Forbeck. Each one is loosely based on a Dungeons & Dragons 5th Edition campaign.

Related series 
The related Super Endless Quest series changed its name to Advanced Dungeons & Dragons Adventure Gamebooks starting with the fourth book; these books added a more complex game system to stories that otherwise share the same style with the Endless Quest books.  A bookmark-style insert was provided with simple Dungeons & Dragons statistics for the book's main character, and a dice-rolling mechanic was added for determining the character's fate within the story.

The Fantasy Forest series of gamebooks (1982–1983) is quite similar to the Endless Quest books, but it is aimed at a somewhat younger audience.

Other similar series from TSR included HeartQuest (interactive romances, set in the world of Dungeons & Dragons), Catacombs Solo Quest (more complex again than Super Endless Quest), and 1 on 1 Adventure Gamebooks that were each a pair of books for two players/readers.

TSR also used the Advanced Dungeons & Dragons Adventure Gamebooks format for books tied into their Marvel Super Heroes roleplaying game, published as single-character Adventure Gamebooks, and later as 1 on 1 Adventure Gamebooks, and featuring licensed Marvel Comics characters.

Reception
The first four Endless Quest books were reviewed by Marcus Rowland in White Dwarf #39 (March 1983). Rowland rated Pillars of Pentegarn as 5 out of 10, Mountain of Mirrors as 4 out of 10, Dungeon of Dread as 6 out of 10, and Return to Brookmere as 7 out of 10. Rowland also reviewed the next two books in the series, giving both Revolt of the Dwarves and Revenge of the Rainbow Dragons 5 out of 10.

Reviews
Isaac Asimov's Science Fiction Magazine
Jeux & Stratégie #31
Science Fiction Chronicle

References

External links
 Official publishers site of the 2008 revisions of the series
 Demian's Endless Quest page
 
 Series 1, Series 2 and Crimson Crystal Adventures at the Internet Book List

Fantasy books by series
Fantasy gamebooks
TSR, Inc. games

fr:Livre-jeu de la série Donjons & Dragons#Les Quêtes sans fin de Donjons & Dragons